"Anything" is the third and final single released by the rock band the Calling from their second album Two. It peaked at number 23 in the US Charts. It was their last single to be released before they split up in 2005. 
The music video portrays the members of the band performing a live concert in front of a girl's house (portrayed by the Alex Band's wife Jennifer Sky).

Critical reception
Chuck Taylor from Billboard praised the song for being both "expertly crafted" and "a crisp musical breath of fresh air", concluding that "With this played beside Bowling for Soup's "1985," adult top 40 will be having more fun than anyone else on the dial."

References

2004 singles
The Calling songs
Songs written by Alex Band
RCA Records singles
2004 songs
Songs written by Aaron Kamin